Scrublands is the first novel by Australian author Chris Hammer. The story is set in the fictitious town of Riversend in New South Wales during a period of intense drought, and revolves around a small-town priest who kills five of his parishioners before being shot himself, and a journalist's investigation into his motivations. The novel is a crime thriller told in third person present tense. It has been optioned for television.

Plot 
Charismatic priest Byron Swift is a hero in Riversend, an isolated town plagued by an intense drought. He leads various community groups and is generally regarded as a dedicated pillar of the community. One Sunday morning, he calmly and without apparent provocation shoots five members of his parish on the steps of the local church. Minutes later, he is shot and killed by a local police officer.

One year on, Martin Scarsden - a troubled journalist - has been dispatched to Riversend to write an anniversary piece on how the crime has impacted the town. As he interviews locals, he learns that the accepted version of events - as reported by his own newspaper - may not be as accurate as initially believed.

Reception 
The book has been met with generally positive reviews - the Sydney Morning Herald described it as a work of "remarkable breadth and depth", with other publications calling it stunning and a brilliant debut.

The book's detailed setting (aided by research for Hammer's previous non-fiction book, The River) is emblematic of the isolation and drought experienced in many rural Australian communities; one publication described it as "full of Australianness".

Hammer was awarded the 2019 John Creasey (New Blood) Dagger by the UK Crime Writers' Association for the book.

See also 
Hammer's second novel, featuring the same protagonist, was Silver (2019).

The Dry, a mystery novel by Jane Harper also set in a drought-stricken Australian town.

References 

2018 Australian novels
Novels set in New South Wales
Novels about journalists
Allen & Unwin books